Sara Parsons (born October 23, 1991) is an American rugby union player. She was named in the Eagles 2017 Women's Rugby World Cup squad. Parsons was named player of the match in the USA’s 24–12 victory over Italy in pool play at the 2017 World Cup, allowing the United States to advance to the semifinals.

She was included in the Eagles team to the 2015 Women's Rugby Super Series in Canada.

Biography 
Parsons played softball at the University of Nevada, Reno until her senior year when she switched to rugby. She attended Churchill County High School. She is the niece of NFL player Harvey Dahl. She participated in several sports in high school including soccer, basketball, volleyball and golf.

References

External links 
 USA Rugby Profile

1991 births
Living people
United States women's international rugby union players
American female rugby union players
Female rugby union players
21st-century American women